Jim "Laz" Laslavic (born October 24, 1951) is a former American Football linebacker who played ten seasons in the National Football League. He is a retired sportscaster for KNSD in San Diego and a former radio announcer for KIOZ. He lives in Coronado, California with his wife, Susan. Together, they raised two kids, Hayley (born 1986) and James (born 1988). Laslavic is a member of Phi Gamma Delta fraternity.

References

American football linebackers
Players of American football from Pennsylvania
Detroit Lions players
San Diego Chargers players
Green Bay Packers players
National Football League announcers
Penn State Nittany Lions football players
San Diego Chargers announcers
Television anchors from San Diego
1951 births
Living people